The White Lake School District is a public school district in Aurora County, based in White Lake, South Dakota.

Schools
The White Lake School District has one elementary school, one junior high school, and one high school.

Elementary schools 
White Lake Elementary School

Junior High schools
White Lake Junior High School

High schools
White Lake High School

References

External links

School districts in South Dakota